Nov Karaorman is a village in the municipality of Karbinci, North Macedonia.

Demographics
As of the 2021 census, Nov Karaorman had 64 residents with the following ethnic composition:
Macedonians 41
Persons for whom data are taken from administrative sources 23

According to the 2002 census, the village had a total of 67 inhabitants. Ethnic groups in the village include:
Macedonians 64
Serbs 1
Romani 2

References

Villages in Karbinci Municipality